Udren Zom is a mountain in the Hindu Kush mountain range in Pakistan. It is one of the highest peaks in the world located outside of the Himalaya and Karakoram ranges. Udren Zom is located in the Khyber Pakhtunkhwa province of Pakistan.

See also
 List of mountains in Pakistan
 List of Ultras of the Western Himalayas

References

Mountains of Khyber Pakhtunkhwa
Mountains of Pakistan
Mountains of the Hindu Kush
Seven-thousanders of the Hindu Kush